Charles Breyer may refer to:

 Charles R. Breyer (born 1941), United States District Judge
 Charles Breyer (soldier) (1844–1914), English soldier who fought in the American Civil War and was awarded the Medal of Honor

See also
 Karl Wilhelm Friedrich von Breyer (1771–1818) German historian
 Breyer (disambiguation)